The House at 28 Wiley Street in Wakefield, Massachusetts is an unusual Federal or Georgian style house.  It is built of brick, a rare construction material in pre-Revolutionary Wakefield.  It appears to have been built as an addition to another house, which has since been destroyed.  Built into a hill, it presents 1.5 stories in front, and 2.5 stories in back.  It has a tradition five bay main facade with a central door, which was embellished with a Federal style surround sometime after its initial construction.  The house was probably built for a member of the Wiley family.

The house was listed on the National Register of Historic Places in 1989.

See also
National Register of Historic Places listings in Wakefield, Massachusetts
National Register of Historic Places listings in Middlesex County, Massachusetts

References

Houses on the National Register of Historic Places in Wakefield, Massachusetts
Federal architecture in Massachusetts
Houses in Wakefield, Massachusetts